Vishwasam... Athallae Ellaam is a 2015 Indian Malayalam-language film directed by Jayaraj Vijay for Flowers creations, starring Shine Tom Chacko, Ansiba Hassan and veteran actor Shankar.
The film was released on 31 July 2015.

Summary 
Vishwasam... Athallae Ellaam is the story of Jomon, an easygoing young man played by Shine Tom Chacko, and his frequent conflicts with his father Luka, a strict police commissioner played by veteran actor Shankar. Jomon is a spoiled brat, who seldom knows how to lead a practical and successful life. He believes that a person can amass wealth only using intelligence. As he wishes, he is entrusted with a task that can make his ambition a reality, but his lack of knowledge in practical life lands him in several troubles.

Cast 
 Shine Tom Chacko as Jomon
 Shankar as A.S.I Lucose
 Ansiba Hassan as Seline
 Archana Jayakrishnan as Rose
 Niyas Backer as Maniyan
 Manoj.K.Jayan as A.C.P Prithyraj Singh I.P.S
 Kalabhavan Shajon
 Sunil Sukhada
 Indrans
 Bhagath Manuel
 Vijayaraghavan as Divakaran

Reception 
The Times of India rated the film at two stars, calling it "a disaster that slips into a B-grade comedy."

References

External links 
 

2010s Malayalam-language films
Indian coming-of-age films
2010s coming-of-age films